Pastorale officium is an apostolic brief issued by Pope Paul III, May 29, 1537,  to Cardinal Juan Pardo de Tavera which declares that anyone who enslaved or despoiled indigenous Americans would be automatically excommunicated.

The harsh threat of punishment (Latae sententiae) contained in Pastorale officium made the conquistadors complain to the Spanish king and Emperor. Charles V went on to argue that the letter was injurious to the Imperial right of colonization and harmful to the peace of the Indies. The urging of Charles V to revoke the briefs and bulls of 1537 exemplifies the tension of the concern for evangelisation as manifested in the teachings of 1537 and the pressure to honor the system of royal patronage. The weakened position of the pope and the memory of the Sack of Rome (1527) a decade earlier by imperial troops made the ecclesiastical authorities hesitant in engaging in any possible confrontation with the Emperor. Under mounting pressure Pope Paul III succumbed and removed the ecclesiastical censures in the letter titled .

The annulling of the ecclesiastical letter was not a denial of the doctrinal teaching of the spiritual equivalence of all human beings. The annulment gave rise to the subsequent papal encyclical Sublimis Deus promulgated by Pope Paul III on June 2, 1537. Thus the Pastorale officium has been seen as a companion document for the encyclical Sublimis Deus.

Stogre notes that Sublimus Dei is not present in Denzinger compendium of theological-historical source texts.

See also 

Catholic Church and the Age of Discovery

References

Further reading 
 Peter Stamatov, The Origins of Global Humanitarianism: Religion, Empires, and Advocacy 
 The Encyclopedia of Christianity: Si-Z , part 5 (Encyclopedia of Christianity (Brill)), 2008
 Georg Olms Verlag, The Popes, the Catholic Church and the Transatlantic Enslavement of Black Africans 1418–1839, 2017
 Michael Stogre (S.J), That the world may believe: the development of Papal social thought on aboriginal rights, Médiaspaul, 1992, 

Christianity and law in the 16th century
16th-century Catholicism
Abolitionism in South America
16th century in Spain
1537 works
16th-century papal bulls
Indigenous land rights
Catholicism and slavery
Documents of Pope Paul III
Excommunication
1537 in Christianity